City Chambers can refer to:
Dundee City Chambers 
Dunfermline City Chambers 
Edinburgh City Chambers 
Glasgow City Chambers

See also
Chambers Building (disambiguation)